Dr. Pairat Decharin (died 26 May 1991) was the governor of Chiang Mai Province, Thailand. He died in the crash of Lauda Air Flight 004 on 26 May 1991, along with his wife and children. Charles S. Ahlgren, the former U.S. consul general to Chiang Mai, said "That accident not only took their lives and that of many of Chiang Mai's leaders, but dealt a blow to many development and planning activities in the town."

References

Pairat Decharin
Pairat Decharin
Victims of aviation accidents or incidents in 1991
Victims of aviation accidents or incidents in Thailand
1937 births
1991 deaths
Pairat Decharin